Beldore Hollow, Virginia (also referred to as "Beldor" and spelled "Beldor Hollow") is an extinct unincorporated community in Rockingham County, Virginia.

The Beldore Hollow community included homesteads, farms, cemeteries, a one-room school, and a village in the mountains of the Shenandoah Valley.

The community became part of Shenandoah National Park, and the area is now locally referred to as the "Beldor Hollow Overlook." 

State Route 628 is locally referred to as Beldor Road.

See also 

 Former counties, cities, and towns of Virginia
 Skyline Drive

References 

Former populated places in Virginia
Populated places in Rockingham County, Virginia
Shenandoah National Park